The 1917 Navy Midshipmen football team represented the United States Naval Academy during the 1917 college football season. In their first season under head coach Gil Dobie, the Midshipmen compiled a 7–1 record, shut out four opponents, and outscored all opponents by a combined score of 442 to 23.

The annual Army–Navy Game was not played this season or the next due to World War I.

Schedule

References

Navy
Navy Midshipmen football seasons
Navy Midshipmen football